Ronielson da Silva Barbosa (born 11 May 1995), commonly known as Rony, is a Brazilian footballer who plays as a forward for Palmeiras.

Career
On 9 January 2017, Albirex Niigata announced that they had signed Roby from Cruzeiro. Niigata had to pay a transfer fee of around R$4 million.

Career statistics

Honours

Club
Remo
Campeonato Paraense: 2014, 2015

Athletico Paranaense
Copa do Brasil: 2019
Copa Sudamericana: 2018
J.League Cup / Copa Sudamericana Championship: 2019

Palmeiras
Copa do Brasil: 2020
Campeonato Paulista: 2020, 2022
Copa Libertadores: 2020, 2021
Recopa Sudamericana: 2022
Campeonato Brasileiro: 2022

Individual
 Copa Libertadores Dream Team: 2020, 2021
 Copa do Brasil Team of the Final: 2019, 2020
 South American Team of the Year: 2020
 Campeonato Paulista Team of the Year: 2021

References

External links

1995 births
Living people
Sportspeople from Pará
Brazilian footballers
Association football forwards
Campeonato Brasileiro Série A players
Campeonato Brasileiro Série B players
Campeonato Brasileiro Série D players
Clube do Remo players
Cruzeiro Esporte Clube players
Clube Náutico Capibaribe players
Club Athletico Paranaense players
Sociedade Esportiva Palmeiras players
J1 League players
Albirex Niigata players
Brazilian expatriate footballers
Copa Libertadores-winning players
Brazilian expatriate sportspeople in Japan
Expatriate footballers in Japan